Gothic Melting Ice Cream's Darkness Nightmare is the first compilation album from Tomoko Kawase's alter ego, Tommy heavenly6. It was released on February 25, 2009 by DefSTAR Records. Its top position on the Oricon charts was number 6.

Overview
There are three versions of the album, a CD only version,a CD+DVD version and a Blue-spec+DVD version. It was released on the same day as Strawberry Cream Soda Pop Daydream, a best-of album by Kawase's other alter ego Tommy February6.

The album contains all of Heavenly6's singles from Wait Till I Can Dream to Papermoon in consecutive order, in addition to select album tracks from Tommy Heavenly6 and Heavy Starry Heavenly and a B-side from Hey My Friend. 
The DVD contains music videos of Heavenly6's singles, "Swear" (from Wait Till I Can Dream), and "Unlimited Sky". It also features making-of clips for certain videos.
A limited digital download single titled "Unlimited Sky" was released to promote the best album. The single contained the original song, as well as an acoustic version. The song also appears on the album.

Track listing

References

2009 compilation albums
Tomoko Kawase albums